Peru competed at the 1988 Summer Olympics in Seoul, South Korea.

Medalists

Competitors
The following is the list of number of competitors in the Games.

Results by event

Athletics
Men's Long Jump 
 Ricardo Valiente 
 Qualification — 6.92m (→ did not advance)

Swimming
Men's 100m Backstroke
 Alejandro Alvizuri
 Heat — 58.37 (→ did not advance, 26th place)

Men's 200m Backstroke
 Alejandro Alvizuri
 Heat — 2:04.29 (→ did not advance, 19th place)

Women's 100m Breaststroke
 Karen Horning
 Heat — 1:14.03 (→ did not advance, 28th place)

Women's 200m Breaststroke
 Karen Horning
 Heat — 2:37.84 (→ did not advance, 24th place)

Volleyball

Women's Team Competition
 Preliminary round (group B)
 Defeated Brazil (3-0)
 Defeated United States (3-2)
 Defeated China (3-2)
 Semi Finals
 Defeated Japan (3-2)
 Final
 Lost to Soviet Union (2-3) →  Silver Medal
 Team roster
Cenaida Uribe 
Rosa García 
Gabriela Pérez del Solar 
Sonia Heredia 
Cecilia Tait 
Luisa Cervera 
Denisse Fajardo 
Alejandra Guerra 
Gina Torrealva 
Natalia Málaga 
Miriam Gallardo 
Kathy Horny 
Head coach: Park Man-Bok

References

Nations at the 1988 Summer Olympics
1988
1988 in Peruvian sport